The Cardrona River is in Otago in the South Island of New Zealand. It is one of the first tributaries of the Clutha River / Mata-Au, which it meets only  from the latter's origin at the outflow of Lake Wānaka.

The Cardrona flows north for  down the steep narrow Cardrona Valley. Its headwaters are near New Zealand's highest main road, the Crown Range route. The river runs past the settlement of  Cardona and the Cardrona skifield, then south of Wānaka township.

It was a traditional Māori route linking Whakatipu Waimāori (Lake Wakatipu) with lakes Wānaka and Hāwea. Ngāi Tahu  recorded Ōrau as a kāinga mahinga kai (food-gathering place) where tuna (eels), pora ('Māori turnip') and weka were gathered.

References

Rivers of Otago
Rivers of New Zealand
Tributaries of the Clutha River